The Harrison River is a short but large tributary of the Fraser River, entering it near the community of Chehalis, British Columbia, Canada.  The Harrison drains Harrison Lake and is the de facto continuation of the Lillooet River, which feeds the lake.

The Harrison is navigable, although in the days of the Fraser Canyon Gold Rush of it was necessary to dredge the sandbars at the confluence with the Fraser, which were known as "the Riffles", and also as "the Falls of the Harrison".  Dredging of these shallows was needed to make the river navigable to Harrison Lake, at the north end of which the townsite of Port Douglas was established as the port for the Douglas Road to Lillooet in the upper Fraser Canyon, in order to bypass hostile territory in the lower Canyon (see Fraser Canyon War).  There are also small rapids and difficult water in the first stretch of the river downstream from Harrison Lake, which is a forested canyon.

Below the confluence of the Chehalis River, at the bridge between Chehalis and the Municipality of Kent, the river widens into a wide backwater, Harrison Bay, then from there joins the Fraser.  In addition to the aforementioned bridge (Hwy 7) the Harrison is also crossed by the mainline of the Canadian Pacific Railway at the site of the former milltown of Harrison Mills and the heritage post office and store preserved as Kilby Provincial Park.

Natural history
The Harrison and Lillooet Rivers support a number of fish species, the most significant of which are chinook salmon (Oncorhynchus tshawytscha), sockeye salmon (Oncorhynchus nerka), coho salmon (Oncorhynchus kisutch), chum salmon (Oncorhynchus keta), pink salmon (Oncorhynchus gorbuscha), rainbow trout (Oncorhynchus mykiss), coastal cutthroat trout (Oncorhynchus clarki clarki), Largescale sucker (Catostomus macrocheilus), and Redside shiner (Richardsonius balteatus).

Discharge
There are a number of stream gauges measuring water levels and discharge along the Harrison River and Harrison Lake. The most downriver discharge-measuring gauge is located at Harrison Hot Springs, just below Harrison Lake. However, the Chehalis River joins the Harrison below this gauge, near Harrison Mills. Thus the mean annual discharge of the Harrison River at its mouth on the Fraser River is at least .

See also
 List of tributaries of the Fraser River
 List of British Columbia rivers

References

Rivers of the Pacific Ranges
Tributaries of the Fraser River
Rivers of the Lower Mainland
New Westminster Land District